Anna Freixas Farré (born 21 July 1946) is a Spanish feminist writer and retired university professor.

Biography
In her doctoral thesis, she analyzed the self-perception of the aging process of women. In 1981 she arrived in Andalusia, when she entered the University of Córdoba, first at the Institute of Education Sciences and then the Faculty of Educational Sciences, where she was Professor of Evolutionary Psychology and Education. She also created and directed (from 1994 to 2001) the Women's Studies Classroom, later transformed into the Leonor de Guzmán Chair.

Her lines of research have concerned the aging of women, coeducation and feminism, and the evolution of research and teaching in psychology from a gender perspective. She is considered to have had pioneering contributions to the development of feminist gerontology in Spain.

Works
 Mujer y envejecimiento. Aspectos psicosociales (La Caixa Foundation, 1993)
 (Ed.) Abuelas, madres, hijas: La transmisión sociocultural del arte de envejecer (Icaria Editorial, 2005)
 Demà més: dones, vides i temps (Institut Català de les Dones, 2006)
 Nuestra menopausia: una versión no oficial (Paidós, 2007)
 Tan frescas. Las nuevas mujeres mayores del siglo XXI (Paidós, 2013)
 Sin reglas. Erótica y libertad femenina en la madurez (Capitán Swing, 2018)
Yo, vieja. Apuntes de supervivencia para seres libres (Capitán Swing, 2021).

Awards and recognitions 
 Freixas's work Mujer y envejecimiento.
 In 1999 she received the 6th Carmen de Burgos Feminist Disclosure Award, granted by the University of Málaga's Association of Historical and Women's Studies.
 In 2019 she was named Doctor Honoris Causa by the Simón Bolívar University of Barranquilla (Colombia). First woman to have this recognition.
 In 2021 she received the Friends of the Elders 2021 Award.

References

External links
 
 

1946 births
20th-century Spanish women writers
21st-century Spanish women writers
Evolutionary psychologists
Feminist studies scholars
Gerontologists
Living people
Spanish feminists
Spanish feminist writers
Spanish women academics
University of Barcelona alumni
Academic staff of the University of Córdoba (Spain)
Writers from Barcelona